Desmidocercidae is a family of nematodes belonging to the order Rhabditida.

Genera:
 Desmidocerca Skrjabin, 1916
 Desmidocercella Yorke & Maplestone, 1926
 Diomedenema Johnston & Mawson, 1952
 Skrjabinocercella Gushanskaya, 1953

References

Nematodes